Rastus is a pejorative term traditionally associated with African Americans in the United States.  It is considered offensive.

History
"Rastus" has been used as a stereotypical, often derogatory, name for black men at least since 1880, when Joel Chandler Harris included a black deacon named "Brer Rastus" in the first Uncle Remus book. However, Rastus (a shortening of Erastus, the Greek name of, especially, Erastus of Corinth)  has never been particularly popular as a black name. For example, the 1870 census reported only 42 individuals named Rastus in the United States, of whom only four were Black or mulatto.

Rastus—as a stereotypically happy black man, not as a particular person—became a familiar character in minstrel shows. This is documented in Every Time I Turn Around: Rite, Reversal, and the End of Blackface Minstrelsy by Jim Comer, in fiction such as Adventures of Rufus Rastus Brown in Darktown (1906) and Rastus Comes to the Point: A Negro Farce, in popular songs such as Rastus, Take Me Back (1909) and (Rufus Rastus Johnson Brown) What You Going to Do When the Rent Comes 'Round (1905), on radio, and in films, most notably the 1908-1917 Rastus series of short films, with titles that included How Rastus Got His Chicken and Rastus Runs Amuck.

Rastus is also the name of the African-American character who first appeared on packages of Cream of Wheat cereal in 1893 and whose image remained the Cream of Wheat trademark until the 1920s, when it was replaced by a photograph of Frank L. White, a Chicago chef in chef's hat and jacket.

Li'l Rastus was the nickname of an African American youth employed as a mascot by the Detroit Tigers from 1908 to 1910.

Anti-segregation editorialist and publisher Ralph McGill was referred to as "Rastus" McGill by white supremacists.

Filmography
Rastus Runs Amuck
How Rastus Got His Chicken
 How Rastus Gets His Turkey
Rastus Among the Zulus, extant short
Rastus Knew It Wasn't (1914)

Some promotional materials for Larry Semon's The Wizard of Oz (1925) identified the black farmhand Snowball as Rastus.

Theater
''Broadway Rastus

See also 
Sambo
Sambo (film series)
Magical Negro
 Aunt Jemima

References

External links
 Connotations of the Names Rastus and Liza An analysis from outside the U.S., from the Department of Translation Studies, University of Tampere, Finland
 blackface From the personal website of william wu
 Was the Cream of Wheat Chef a Real Person? From The Jim Crow Museum of Racist Memorabilia
 The Advertiser's Holy Trinity: Aunt Jemima, Rastus, and Uncle Ben From The Museum of Public Relations
 Collection of mid-twentieth century adverting featuring Rastus from The TJS Labs Gallery of Graphic Design.
 How Rastus Got His Turkey (1910), Short film, Times Review.
 Rastus Among the Zulus (1913), Short film, from The Internet Movie Database
 Rastus Runs Amuck (1917), Short film, from The Internet Movie Database

Food advertising characters
Male characters in advertising
Stereotypes of African Americans
Anti-African and anti-black slurs
Mascots introduced in 1893